Shona is  a female name of Gaelic origin. (Scottish and Irish)

Given name
Shona (singer), French singer
Shona Auerbach, British film director
Shona Banda (born 1978/9), American medical cannabis rights activist
Shona Barbour (born 1979), Canadian curler
Shona Bell (1924–2011), New Zealand palaeontologist
Shona Brown (born c. 1966), American businesswoman
Shona Brownlee (born 1979), British skier and RAF aircraftwoman
Shona Rapira Davies (born 1951), sculptor and painter of Ngati Wai ki Aotea tribal descent
Shona Fraser (born 1975), British music journalist
Shona Holmes, Canadian woman who controversially underwent treatment for a Rathke's cleft cyst in the U.S. and claimed that it threatened her life
Shona Kinloch (born 1962), Scottish artist 
Shona Laing (born 1955), New Zealand musician
Shona Le Mottee, Canadian Celtic/pop fiddler and vocalist
Shona Macdonald (born 1969), Scottish artist and academic
Shona Dunlop MacTavish (1920–2019), New Zealand dancer and dance teacher
Shona Marshall (born 1964), Scottish sport shooter
Shona McCallin (born 1992), English international field hockey player
Shona McGarty (born 1991), British actress
Shona McIntyre (born 1980), Scottish former international cricketer
Shona McIsaac (born 1960), British politician
Shona Mooney (born c. 1984), Scottish fiddle player and composer
Shona Morgan (born 1990), Australian former gymnast
Shona Moss (born 1969), Canadian sailor
Shona Powell-Hughes (born 1991), Welsh Rugby Union player
Shona Robison (born 1966), Scottish politician
Shona Rubens (born 1986), Canadian alpine skier
Shona Schleppe (born 1963), Canadian former field hockey player
Shona Seawright (born 1977), Irish cricketer
Shona Thorburn (born 1982), British-born basketball player in the WNBA
Shona Tucker, American actress

Fictional characters
Shona Ramsey, a character in the TV soap-opera Coronation Street

Scottish feminine given names